52 Hz, I Love You is a 2017 Taiwanese musical drama film directed by Wei Te-sheng. It was released on January 26, 2017.

Premise
52Hz, I Love You comprises various love stories set in modern Taipei City on Valentine's Day. The title of the film references the 52-hertz whale, described as "the world's loneliest whale" as no other whales can hear its unusual frequency call. This serves as a metaphor for loneliness and finding love.

Cast
Lin Zhong-yu as Ang
Zhuang Juan-ying as Xin
Suming as Da-he
Mify Chen as Lei

Cameo appearance

Sandrine Pinna as Qi
Nana Lee as Mei
Lin Ching-tai as Dong
Cyndi Chao as Xin's Aunt
Cheng Wei-da as Xin's Brother 
Sun Ruei as Girlfriend of Xin's Brother 
Van Fan as Band Member
Ma Nien-hsien as Band Member
Min Hsiung as Band Member
Ying Wei-min as Band Member
Chie Tanaka as Server
Shino Lin as Server
Joanne Yang as Server
Ma Ju-lung as Customer
Pei Hsiao-lan as Customer
Ko Wen-je as himself
Allison Limmer as extra

Soundtrack

Reception

Box office
As of March 4, 2017, 52Hz, I Love You grossed NT$45.5 million, against a production budget of NT$80 million.

In Taiwan, 52Hz, I Love You was released alongside domestic productions The Village of No Return and Hanky Panky, and Hollywood films Resident Evil: The Final Chapter, Moana and Hidden Figures, and was projected to gross NT$100 million over the Lunar New Year holiday frame. It went on to make NT$22.8 million in its opening weekend, ranking seventh at the Taipei box office.

With the film's box office performance in Taiwan, the film was considered a box office disappointment, making it one of the lowest-grossing films from Wei Te-sheng. The filmmaker had previously directed the financially successful Cape No. 7 (2008) and Seediq Bale (2011), namely the highest and second-highest grossing domestic film of all time at the Taiwan box office. In an interview, Wei stated that the film's overall financial success will depend on its international distribution and VOD sales, as well as merchandising sales revenue.

Critical response
Elizabeth Kerr of The Hollywood Reporter said, "predictable though it may be, Wei has been careful to replicate the whimsical ebbs, flows and beats required of the form, and 52Hz, I Love You captures the cotton candy essence of the musical romance rather effectively." Edmund Lee of South China Morning Post rated it 2.5/5 stars and wrote that the film "proves to be a pleasant trifle, which does a far more effective job of pleasing the ear than stirring the heart".

References

External links

2017 films
Taiwanese musical drama films
2010s Mandarin-language films
2010s musical drama films
Films directed by Wei Te-sheng
2017 drama films